The 16th Special Operations Squadron is part of the 27th Special Operations Wing at Cannon Air Force Base, New Mexico. It operates the AC-130W Stinger II aircraft in support of special operations.

Mission 
Train and maintain its combat-ready force to provide highly accurate firepower in support of both conventional and unconventional forces.

History

World War II
The 16th ferried aircraft from factories to units in US and Canada and conducted pilot training from April 1942 – April 1944. It flew combat aerial transportation missions from India into Burma and China from December 1944 – October 1945.

Vietnam War
The 16th flew combat missions in Southeast Asia where it was charged with attacking convoys on the Ho Chi Minh Trail, the defense of hamlets and fire bases, providing close air support to troops in contact with the enemy, providing convoy escort, and battlefield illumination, November 1968 – July 1974. As the war drew to a close the squadron supported Operation Eagle Pull, the evacuation of Phnom Penh, Operation Frequent Wind, the evacuation of Saigon and figured prominently in the rescue of the Mayagüez. In all 53 members of the 16 SOS were killed in action during the Vietnam War.

Hurlburt Field
In November 1979 the 16th set a flight endurance record of 29.7 hours, flying non-stop from Hurlburt Field, Florida to Andersen Air Force Base, Guam.

The 16th supported the multi-national assault on Grenada on 25 October 1983. It provided last-second surveillance and intelligence to the air assault forces, silencing anti-aircraft artillery emplacements, knocking out enemy armored personnel carriers, defending political dignitaries surrounded by enemy troops, and relieving troops in combat.

From late December 1989 to 14 January 1990, the squadron participated in the invasion of Panama during Operation Just Cause. 16 SOS aircrews received the MacKay Trophy and the 1989 Military Airlift Command Aircrew of the Year, for their actions destroying the headquarters for the Panamanian Defense Force, and providing fire support for the Army Ranger assault on Rio Hato Air Base.

On 12 September 1990 The 16th arrived in Saudi Arabia to support Operations Desert Shield and Desert Storm, the protection of Saudi Arabia and liberation of Kuwait. The squadron flew 50 combat missions in Desert Storm and lost one aircraft and 14 airmen on 31 January 1991, while supporting coalition forces engaged in the Battle of Khafji.

During 1993 and 1994, the 16th deployed to Africa in support of Operation Continue Hope, the United Nations relief effort in Somalia. Squadron crews based out of Djibouti struck targets in Mogadishu, and later deployed to Kenya to ensure security for UN forces. During this deployment, a gunship was destroyed due to an in-borne detonation of the 105mm gun while airborne. Eight of the 14 aircrew members lost their lives in this accident.

The 16 SOS deployed to Italy in support of Operation Deny Flight periodically from July 1993 until its termination on 28 August 1995. 16 SOS aircraft actively patrolled the skies over Bosnia and Herzegovina, providing protective air cover and close air support to UN protection forces.

While maintaining the Operation Deny Flight mission, the 16 SOS also deployed to other parts of the world for 184 days. From 18 September-19 October 1994, it deployed to Cuba in support of Operation Uphold Democracy and provided air support to coalition forces during the ouster of General Raoul Cédras and restoration of Jean-Bertrand Aristide in Haiti. Additionally, from 30 January −2 March 1995, the 16th SOS returned to Africa in support of Operation United Shield, the withdrawal of UN forces from Mogadishu, Somalia. On the final night of this operation, the gunships provided real-time intelligence to ground commanders via armed reconnaissance and surveillance during the U.S. Marine amphibious withdrawal from Mogadishu.

Operation Deliberate Force began on 19 August 1995. It was the largest NATO air operation in history. The 16 SOS flew multiple combat search and rescue sorties from 6–8 September in support of the rescue attempt of a French Mirage aircrew downed by a surface-to-air missile near Pale. During the operation, which lasted until 15 September, the 16th expended 268 rounds of 105MM and 125 rounds of 40MM against early warning radar sites and command and control facilities. The 16th also participated in Operations Decisive Endeavor, Joint Endeavor, Assured Response, Deliberate Guard, Joint Guard, Goal Keeper, and Wintering Over.

Following the 11 September terrorist attacks the 16th deployed on 11 November 2001 to an undisclosed location near Afghanistan to support Operation Enduring Freedom. The day after arriving in Afghanistan, the 16th attacked Taliban and Al-Qaeda forces near the city of Konduz in support of Northern Alliance forces, and was directly responsible for the city's surrender the next day. On 26 November the squadron supported the suppression of a rebellion at the prison fort of Qala-i-Jangi While supporting the beleaguered U.S. CIA and allied British forces throughout the night with withering 40mm and 105mm fire, Spectre succeeded in ending the rebellion of Taliban and Al-Qaeda POWs.

The 16th also flew missions over Mazār-e Sharīf, Kunduz, Kandahar, Shkin, Asadabad, Bagram, Baghran, Tora Bora, and nearly every other part of Afghanistan. The squadron has participated in a number of operations within Afghanistan including Operations Full Throttle, Roll Tide, and Eagle Fury. It also performed on-call close air support and armed reconnaissance over Kandahar after an assassination attempt against Afghanistan's President, Hamid Karzai.

In March 2002, the 16th flew 39 combat missions in support of Operation Anaconda in Afghanistan. With only 3 aircraft and 3 crews, the squadron amassed 322 combat hours over 12 days, resulting in 45 enemies killed in action, nine vehicles destroyed, 11 damaged vehicles, and 12 destroyed and 25 damaged buildings. During the intense fighting, the squadron expended more than 1,300 40MM and 1,200 105MM rounds. Their actions earned them the 2002 Mackay Trophy, and 2002 Air Force aviator valor awards. In addition, in 2002 the 16th SOS was the third most deployed unit in the Air Force.

27 May 2015, retired the final AC-130H Spectre Gunship in service, tail number #69-6569 "Excalibur". Converted to AC-130W Stinger IIs during 2015.

Operations

 World War II
 Vietnam War 
 Operation Urgent Fury
 Operation Just Cause
 Operation Desert Shield
 Operation Desert Storm
 Operation Continue Hope
 Operation Deny Flight
 Operation Uphold Democracy
 Operation Deliberate Force

 Operation Decisive Endeavor
 Operation Joint Endeavor
 Operation Assured Response
 Operation Deliberate Guard
 Operation Joint Guard
 Operation Goal Keeper
 Operation Wintering Over
 Operation Enduring Freedom
 Operation Iraqi Freedom
 Operation Inherent Resolve

Lineage
 16th Ferrying Squadron
 Constituted as the 16th Air Corps Ferrying Squadron on 18 February 1942
 Activated on 16 April 1942
 Redesignated 16th Ferrying Squadron on 12 May 1943
 Disbanded on 1 April 1944
 Reconstituted and consolidated with the 16th Combat Cargo Squadron and the 16th Special Operations Squadron as the 16th Special Operations Squadron on 19 September 1985

 16th Combat Cargo Squadron
 Constituted as the 16th Combat Cargo Squadron on 9 June 1944
 Activated on 13 June 1944
 Inactivated on 29 December 1945
 Disbanded on 8 October 1948; reconstituted on 19 September 1985)
 Reconstituted and consolidated with the 16th Ferrying Squadron and the 16th Special Operations Squadron as the 16th Special Operations Squadron on 19 September 1985

 16th Special Operations Squadron
 Constituted as the 16th Special Operations Squadron on 11 October 1968
 Activated on 30 October 1968
 Consolidated with the 16th Ferrying Squadron and the 16th Combat Cargo Squadron on 19 September 1985

Assignments
 Middle West Sector, Air Corps Ferrying Command (later 5th Ferrying Group), 16 April 1942 – 1 April 1944
 4th Combat Cargo Group, 13 June 1944
 Army Air Forces, India-Burma Theater, 5 September 1945
 4th Combat Cargo Group, c. October–29 December 1945
 8th Tactical Fighter Wing, 30 October 1968 (attached to 388th Tactical Fighter Wing, 19 July 1974 – 8 December 1975)
 Tactical Air Command, 8 December 1975
 1st Special Operations Wing, 12 December 1975
 1st Special Operations Group (later 16 Operations Group, 1st Special Operations Group), 22 September 1992
 27th Special Operations Group, 1 June 2009 – present

Stations

 Hensley Field, Texas, 16 April 1942
 Love Field, Texas, 8 September 1942 – 1 April 1944
 Syracuse Army Air Base, New York, 13 June 1944
 Bowman Field, Kentucky, 16 August–9 November 1944
 Sylhet Airfield, India, 7 December 1944
 Agartala Airport, India, 26 December 1944
 Chittagong Airfield, India, 31 January 1945
 Namponmao Airfield, Burma, 11 June 1945
 Ledo Airfield, India, 3 September 1945
 Namponmao Airfield, Burma, October 1945
 Ondal Airfield, India, November–29 December 1945
 Ubon Royal Thai Air Force Base, Thailand, 30 October 1968
 Korat Royal Thai Air Force Base, Thailand, 19 July 1974
 Hurlburt Field, Florida, 12 December 1975
 Cannon Air Force Base, New Mexico, 1 June 2009 – present

Aircraft
 Ferried tactical and support aircraft (1942–1944) C–47, 1944, 1945; C–46, 1944–1945. AC–130, 1968–.
 Douglas C-47 Skytrain (1944, 1945)
 Curtiss C-46 Commando (1944–1945)
 Lockheed AC-130A, AC-130E, AC-130H Spectre (1968–2015)
 Lockheed AC-130W Stinger II (2015 – present)

References

Notes
 Explanatory notes

 Citations

Bibliography 

 
 
 
 

Military units and formations in New Mexico
016